Poshteh-ye Samavat (also Romanized as Poshteh-ye Samāvāt; also known as Cheshmeh Samāvāt, Mashhadī Qāsem-e Samāvāt, and Posht Samāvāt) is a village in Cheleh Rural District, in the Central District of Gilan-e Gharb County, Kermanshah Province, Iran. At the 2006 census, its population was 106, in 22 families.

References 

Populated places in Gilan-e Gharb County